Bhairabi Temple is a Hindu temple in Bidur Municipality, Nuwakot, Nepal. It is dedicated to goddess Bhairavi, the consort of god Bhairav.

History 
The temple was built around Nepal's first king Prithvi Narayan Shah's reign. The April 2015 Nepal earthquake devastated the Bhairabi Temple and it was restored in August 2020. In 1793, Bahadur Shah installed a copper plate declaring Nepal's victory in the First Sino-Nepalese War at the temple.

See also 

 Nuwakot Palace
 Gorkha Durbar
 Bagh Bhairab Temple

References 

Hindu temples in Bagmati Province
Buildings and structures in Nuwakot District
18th-century establishments in Nepal